Aedes (Dendroskusea) ramachandrai is a species complex of zoophilic mosquito belonging to the genus Aedes. It is known to endemic to India, but some texts found it in Sri Lanka as well.

References

ramachandrai